Ilya Petrovich Vorobiev (born in 1975) is a Russian and German retired ice hockey player who is currently coaching the Metallurg Magnitogorsk.

Born March 16, 1975 in Riga, Vorobiev is the eldest son of the former hockey player and current hockey coach Petr Vorobiev. After 18 years in Germany he then played for Russia. He finished his career with the Frankfurt Lions (2007—2010).

Vorobiev has been involved with the junior and youth teams of Russia. He participated twice in the all-star game of the German hockey League (1999, 2001). He was a silver medalist of the 2002 German championships as part of the Adler Mannheim]. Beside that, Vorobiev was part of the Russian team Metallurg Magnitogorsk, which won the 2007 Russian Superleague.

After retiring for some time he carried out administrative work for the Russian team. In the 2011–12 season, he debuted as a coach. On May 3, 2012 he was appointed the senior coach of the hockey club Metallurg Magnitogorsk. On October 17, 2015, he was appointed head coach.

On April 19, 2016, in his first season as coach, he led the team to victory in the Gagarin Cup (which he previously won as an assistant coach).

Since 2016 Ilya Vorobiev has been a stable member of the coaching staff of the Russian national team headed by Oleg Znarok. On April 12, 2018 he was appointed acting head coach of Russia.

On July 9, 2019 he was dismissed from the posts of head coach in the Russian national team and SKA Saint Petersburg.

References

External links

1975 births
Living people
Ice hockey people from Riga
Russian ice hockey centres
German ice hockey players
Russian ice hockey coaches
Krefeld Pinguine players
Adler Mannheim players
HC Lada Togliatti players
Metallurg Magnitogorsk players
Atlant Moscow Oblast players
Naturalized citizens of Germany
Russia men's national ice hockey team coaches